The European Youth Olympic Festival (EYOF) is a biennial multi-sport event for youth (14 to 18 years old) athletes from the 50 member countries of the association of European Olympic Committees. The festival has a summer edition, held for the first time in Brussels in 1991, and a winter edition, which began two years later in Aosta. It was known as the European Youth Olympic Days from 1991 to 1999.

History
The event is run by the European Olympic Committees, under the patronage of the International Olympic Committee, and was the first multi-sport event in the Olympic tradition specifically for European athletes; it predates its senior equivalent, the European Games by some 24 years, and the Youth Olympic Games by 19 years.

The event should not be confused with the various European junior and youth championships in individual sports, such as the European Junior Athletics Championships which are organised by sporting federations.

Editions

Summer

Winter

Sports

Summer Games

Winter Games

All-time medal table

Summer Games
Summer editions, from 1991 to 2022 European Youth Summer Olympic Festival.

 </onlyinclude>

Winter Games
Winter editions, from 1993 to 2023 European Youth Olympic Winter Festival.

 </onlyinclude>

Combined medal table
From 1991 to 2023 European Youth Olympic Winter Festival.

 </onlyinclude>

See also
European Para Youth Games (EPYG)
European Games
Youth Olympic Games
Australian Youth Olympic Festival (AYOF)
Asian Youth Games (AYG)
South American Youth Games
Pan American Youth Games

References

External links

 Official website

 
Recurring sporting events established in 1991
European youth sports competitions

Youth multi-sport events
Multi-sport events in Europe
Sports festivals in Europe